The Zenith Albatross Z-12  was a large, three-engined airliner built in the United States in 1928. It could carry up to 11 passengers. Only one was completed.

Design and development

The Zenith Albtross Z-12 was designed and built by the Zenith Aircraft Company of Santa Ana, California and first flew there in January 1930. By October 1929 Schofield Inc had bought the rights to build it at their Los Angeles factory and by January 1930 the prototype had been re-engined there.

When the Albatross first flew in January 1928 it was described as the largest aircraft built on the West Coast. Its two spar wing was rectangular in plan out to rounded tips and braced on each side by a parallel pair of streamlined struts from the lower fuselage longerons to the spars.

The Albatross was initially powered by three  Siemens-Halske Sh 14 engines but in 1930 Schofield replaced them with  Axelson A-7Rs. Both were 7 cylinder radial engines and were  similarly mounted. The outer pair were attached to the forward wing strut, with triplets of upward struts to the forward spar and horizontal struts to the fuselage, and the central engine was mounted on the slender nose of the forward fuselage.

Behind the central engine the fuselage expanded rapidly to the pilots' enclosed cabin, ahead of the wing leading edge, which seated the two pilots. In the original Zenith cabin there was also a bunk to allow one of the pilots to sleep on a long flight, but the Schofield layout seated a navigator instead. Immediately behind and below the crew a windowed cabin had individual seats for 9 passengers and a two or three-seater couch. Passengers entered their cabin via a left side door at the rear. There was a toilet behind the cabin together with a baggage compartment, though there was another baggage hold below the pilots' cabin.
   
The tail was conventional, with tailplane and elevators set at mid-fuselage. The fin was triangular and carried a near rectangular, balanced rudder.

The Albatross had fixed, split axle, tailwheel landing gear. The main wheels were on V-struts from the lower fuselage longerons, with vertical shock-absorbing landing legs joining the forward wing struts at the engine mountings. At some date between March 1928 and February 1930 the struts and legs were enclosed in aircraft fairings and the wheels semi-enclosed.

Operational history 

After its first flight in January 1928, preparations began for an attempt on the world endurance record. At a cruising speed of  the flight would have lasted just over 70 hrs but no reports of a record attempt are known.

Also unknown is the date of the first flight with Axelson engines but by January 1930 it was reported as flying satisfactorily with them. Though Schofield had originally intended to put the Albatross into production there is no evidence of further examples.

Specifications (Axelson engines)

References

Three-engined aircraft
1920s United States airliners